"Bad, Bad Leroy Brown" is an uptempo, strophic story song written by American folk rock singer Jim Croce. Released as part of his 1973 album Life and Times, the song was a No. 1 hit for him, spending two weeks at the top of the Billboard Hot 100 in July 1973.  Billboard ranked it as the No. 2 song for 1973.

Croce was nominated for two 1973 Grammy Awards in the Pop Male Vocalist and Record of the Year categories for "Bad, Bad Leroy Brown". It was his only number-one single before his death on September 20 of that year.

Synopsis
The song's titular character is a 6'4" tall man from the South Side of Chicago whose size, attitude, and tendency to carry weapons have given him a reputation in which he is adored by women and feared by men. He is said to dress in fancy clothes and wear diamond rings, and to own a custom Lincoln Continental and a Cadillac Eldorado, implying he has a lot of money. He is also known to carry a .32 caliber handgun in his pocket and a razor in his shoe. One day in a bar he makes a pass at a pretty married woman named Doris, whose jealous husband engages Brown in a fight. Leroy loses badly, and is described as looking "like a jigsaw puzzle with a couple of pieces gone".

The story of a widely feared man being bested in a fight is similar to that of Croce's earlier song "You Don't Mess Around with Jim".

According to Billboard, it is "filled with humorous lines and a catchy arrangement."  Cash Box described it as "a delightful new single in the same musical vein as his 'You Don't Mess Around with Jim' smash that started his career."

Inspiration
Croce's inspiration for the song was a friend he met in his brief time in the US Army:

He told a variation of this story on The Helen Reddy Show in July 1973:

Croce explained the chorus reference to Leroy Brown being "meaner than a junkyard dog":

Track listing
North American 7" Single (ABC-11359)
 "Bad, Bad Leroy Brown" – 3:02
 "A Good Time Man Like Me Ain't Got No Business (Singin' The Blues)" – 2:03
UK 7" Single (Vertigo 6073 258)
 "Roller Derby Queen" – 3:28
 "Bad, Bad Leroy Brown" – 3:02
International 7" Single (Vertigo 6073 256)
 "Bad, Bad Leroy Brown" – 3:02
 "Hard Time Losin' Man" – 2:24

Personnel 
 Jim Croce – rhythm guitar, vocals
 Maury Muehleisen – acoustic guitar, backing vocals
 Tommy West – bass, piano, backing vocals
 Gary Chester – drums
 Joe Macho – bass
 Willie "Slim" McCoy - backing vocals
 Terry Cashman – backing vocals
 Ellie Greenwich – backing vocals
 Tasha Thomas – backing vocals

The recording session that produced the song was one of several for Croce which employed session drummer Gary Chester.

Chart history
"Bad, Bad Leroy Brown" entered the charts in April 1973 and peaked at number one on the American charts three months later. It was still on the charts on September 20 when Croce died in a plane crash in Natchitoches, Louisiana. It was the second #1 song on the Billboard Hot 100 pop singles chart to include a curse word ("damn") in its lyrics, after the "Theme from Shaft".

Weekly charts

Year-end charts

All-time charts

Certifications

Cover version and tribute 
In 1974 Frank Sinatra included the song on his album Some Nice Things I've Missed. This version was released as a single by Reprise Records and peaked at #83 on the Hot 100 in June of that year.

Queen recorded a sequel of sorts to the song called "Bring Back That Leroy Brown" on their 1974 album Sheer Heart Attack.

Dean Reed covered this.

References

1973 singles
Billboard Hot 100 number-one singles
Jim Croce songs
Songs about fictional male characters
Songs about Chicago
Frank Sinatra songs
Anthony Armstrong Jones songs
Cashbox number-one singles
RPM Top Singles number-one singles
Boogie-woogie songs
Songs written by Jim Croce
Little Willie Littlefield songs
ABC Records singles